William Fauntleroy was an English 16th-century Fellow of New College, Oxford and a vice-chancellor of the University of Oxford.

Fauntleroy was born in Sherborne, Dorset. He was the son of John Fauntleroy and the brother of Elizabeth Fauntleroy, Abbess of Amesbury. He gained a Doctor of Divinity in 1506 at New College in Oxford. He was appointed Vice-Chancellor of Oxford University as part of a committee multiple times annually during 1506 to 1513. He was probably Rector of Lydlinch in Dorset during 1527–1537.

References

Bibliography
 

Year of birth unknown
Year of death unknown
People from Sherborne
16th-century English clergy
Alumni of New College, Oxford
Fellows of New College, Oxford
Vice-Chancellors of the University of Oxford